Manuel Barrueco (born December 16, 1952) is a Cuban classical guitarist. During three decades of concert performances he has performed and recorded across the United States and has been involved in many successful collaborations. In addition, he teaches at the Peabody Institute in Baltimore, Maryland.

Career

Barrueco was born in Cuba on December 16, 1952. Manuel Barrueco began playing the guitar at the age of eight, and he attended the Esteban Salas Conservatory in his native Cuba. He immigrated with his family to the United States in 1967 as political refugees. His first recordings aroused excitement about his skills and musical interpretation. Ever since, Barrueco has toured extensively, appearing in some of the world's most important musical centers, including New York City, Los Angeles, Chicago, London, Munich, Madrid, Barcelona, Milan, Rome, Copenhagen, Athens, South Korea, Taipei, Singapore, Hong Kong, and Japan.

Barrueco has made well over a dozen recordings for EMI, including his 2006 album, ¡Cuba!, which was called "an extraordinary musical achievement" by the San Francisco Chronicle, while his recording of Joaquín Rodrigo's Concierto de Aranjuez with conductor/tenor Plácido Domingo and the Philharmonia Orchestra, was mentioned as the best recording of that piece in Classic CD Magazine. His Nylon & Steel, is a collection of duos with guitar greats: Al Di Meola, Steve Morse (Deep Purple), and Andy Summers (The Police), further demonstrating Barrueco's outstanding versatility and imaginative programming. In the spring of 2006, Concierto Barroco was released by EMI in Europe and Koch International in the United States, containing world premiere recordings of new works for guitar and orchestra by Roberto Sierra and Arvo Pärt, as well as two guitar concertos by Antonio Vivaldi.

In 2007 Manuel Barrueco received a Grammy nomination for the "Best Instrumental Soloist Performance" for his "Solo Piazzolla", which was the first recording to be released on the exclusive Manuel Barrueco Collection on Tonar Music. Tango Sensations and Sounds of the Americas came out subsequently in collaboration with the Cuarteto Latinoamericano, the latter received a Latin Grammy Award for "Inca Dances" by Gabriela Lena Frank for "Best Classical Contemporary Composition." "Guitar Duos" was released in 2009 and includes the most breathtaking guitar duos from the Spanish and Latin-American repertoire. In 2010 he released a solo recording, "Tárrega!", which includes works and arrangements of the Spanish composer Francisco Tárrega and which received a Latin Grammy nomination for "Best Classical Album." His latest release Chaconne–A Baroque Recital came out in 2012.

In October 2013 he released Medea, which includes Barrueco's arrangement of the ballet by flamenco guitarist/composer Manolo Sanlúcar recorded with the Tenerife Symphony Orchestra and Víctor Pablo Pérez conducting, and in May 2014 he released China West, a recording of guitar trios in collaboration with his protégés, the Beijing Guitar Duo (Su Meng & Wang Yameng).

Barrueco's commitment to contemporary music and to the expansion of the guitar repertoire has led him to collaborations with many distinguished composers such as Steven Stucky, Michael Daugherty, Roberto Sierra, Arvo Pärt, Jonathan Leshnoff, Gabriela Lena Frank, Dmitri Yanov-Yanovsky, and Toru Takemitsu, whose last orchestral work Spectral Canticle was a double concerto written specifically for Manuel Barrueco and violinist Frank Peter Zimmerman.

His performances have been broadcast by television stations such as NHK in Japan, Bayerischer Rundfunk in Germany, and RTVE in Spain. In the United States, he has been featured in a Lexus car commercial, on CBS Sunday Morning, A&E's Breakfast with the Arts, and Mister Rogers' Neighborhood. A one-hour documentary portrait, Manuel Barrueco: A Gift and a Life, was produced in 2006. It includes several performances and interviews, in one of which he reminisces over his childhood years in Cuba, and pledges never to return until the present communist regime has come to an end.

Awards
In 1974, at the age of 22, he became the first classical guitarist to receive the Concert Artists Guild Award.

In 2012 Barrueco was named a Fontanals Fellow of United States Artists.

See also

Classical guitar in Cuba

References

External links
 Official Homepage
 Record company Tonar
 Some photos of LP covers (Oviatt Library Digital Collections)
 Interview with UrbanGuitar.com
 Interview with Paul Magnussen for Guitar magazine (Apr 1983)
 Interview with Greg Szeto for Aural States (Dec 2007) alt.
 In Session: Manuel Barrueco Forum GFA "Guitar Foundation of America" 
 Leo Brouwer and Manuel Barrueco Interviews by David Reynolds
https://peabody.jhu.edu/faculty/manuel-barrueco/

1952 births
Cuban classical guitarists
Cuban male guitarists
Johns Hopkins University faculty
MNRK Music Group artists
Living people
Peabody Institute faculty